, also known as  is a Japanese actress, born on March 4, 1984.

Iwamura is best known for her role as Mai in Battle Royale. She also fulfills some "stand-in" roles as Izumi Kanai, Noriko Nakagawa, Hirono Shimizu, and Haruka Tanizawa. Iwamura also stars as Mai in Battle Royale II: Requiem. She also voiced MarineAngemon in the anime Digimon Tamers.

Filmography

TV anime 
2012

 JoJo no Kimyō na Bōken as Woman (Part 1: Ep02)

External links

 Aiko Iwamura - Y・M・O 
 Ai Iwamura Blog 
 

Japanese film actresses
Japanese television actresses
Japanese voice actresses
1984 births
Living people
21st-century Japanese actresses